Manoba umbrimedia is a moth in the family Nolidae. It was described by Joseph de Joannis in 1928. It is found in Vietnam.

References

Moths described in 1928
Nolinae